Route 7 is  long and runs from Fredericton, near an interchange with Route 8, to an interchange with Route 1 in Saint John. Most of the highway is either a divided expressway or has limited access. 

Designated the Vanier Highway between Fredericton and an interchange with Route 2 (the Trans-Canada Highway) in Lincoln, Route 7 runs concurrently with Route 2 to Oromocto.  From Oromocto, it turns south and passes through CFB Gagetown.

History 
The main road from Fredericton to Saint John was first numbered Route 7 in 1965. The original routing followed present-day Route 102 from Fredericton to Oromocto, and the "Broad Road" (formerly Route 2A) from Oromocto to Welsford. The Vanier Highway, originally Route 12 when it was partially opened in Fredericton, was redesignated as part of Route 7 when it was fully completed to Oromocto in 1976, and a section of the Broad Road through Geary was bypassed in the early 1980s. The towns of Grand Bay and Westfield were bypassed in 1986, with the former alignment of Route 7 renamed Route 177.

In 1991, Route 7 was extended south from its original southern end at Ocean West Way (Route 100) on Saint John's west side to Route 1.

Starting in 2007 planning commenced to construct animal fencing along a large section of Route 7. Construction began in the Fall of 2007 and continuing during the Summer of 2008. Animal crossings were also constructed in various places. Because the majority of Route 7 runs through CFB Gagetown, environmental assessments and approval had to be obtained from the Department of National Defence.

In October 2013, the Welsford Bypass opened and the uncontrolled section of Route 7 was renamed Eagle Rock Road.  This new section by-passes the village of Welsford.

An earlier Route 7 went from Perth-Andover to Maine. This was renumbered Route 19 in 1965, and is now Route 190.

Exit list 
From north to south:

See also
List of New Brunswick provincial highways

References

New Brunswick provincial highways
Roads in York County, New Brunswick
Roads in Sunbury County, New Brunswick
Roads in Queens County, New Brunswick
Roads in Kings County, New Brunswick
Roads in Saint John County, New Brunswick
Transport in Fredericton
Transport in Saint John, New Brunswick